Mark Voigt (born October 5, 1961) is a former NASCAR driver. He raced three times in the Busch Series in 2001. He is also a local dirt track driver.

Racing career

Voigt began his career at age four, when his father (involved in racing) bought him his first go-kart. It took him a while, but at the age of 16 he began his career by winning  back to back St. Louis Karting Association Championships.

In 1982, at the Highland Speedway, Mark moved to the Sportsman class and was Rookie of the Year. Then, he later moved up to the modifieds, where he claimed another Rookie of the Year. By the 1990s he was in Late Models, where he began finishing high in the UMP (late model) point standings. By 1995, he had finished second nationally, and had won the Missouri state championship.

In the 1997 racing season, Mark moved to the ARCA Racing Series running two asphalt tracks and one dirt track. Behind the wheel of No. 30 Chevrolet Monte Carlo for his own team (Voigt Racing), he pulled out a 4th-place finish at Winchester Speedway. In 1998, he ran three speedway races - with a best run of 20th (Michigan). His best qualifying run was at Salem Speedway in 1998 where he started 3rd. His best finish in the championship was 18th in the 1998 ARCA championship. Mark left the series following 2001, after 34 starts, 2 Top-5 and 7 Top-10.

Voigt attempted to make two races early in the NASCAR Busch Series 2001 season, but failed to qualify both times. Finally, he made his debut in the No. 30 Voigt Racing Chevy at Darlington in September 2001. He barely made the field, qualifying last place in 43rd. However, he did improve to 36th before falling out of the race. He then ran Memphis, starting 41st and finishing 34th in a minor improvement from his debut. Voigt then ran a race at Phoenix for HighLine Performance Group. However, he finished last (43rd) after parking the car early. He has not raced in NASCAR Busch Series since.

In 2002, Voigt moved to the NASCAR Midwest Series. He would finish 16th in points in his first full season in 2003, with little success, where he had 1 Top-10 in 16 starts. Voigt would leave that ride after 2004.

Since 2005, Voigt has been racing late models at I-55 Speedway, winning a number of races.

Motorsports career results

NASCAR
(key) (Bold – Pole position awarded by qualifying time. Italics – Pole position earned by points standings or practice time. * – Most laps led.)

Busch Series

ARCA Re/Max Series
(key) (Bold – Pole position awarded by qualifying time. Italics – Pole position earned by points standings or practice time. * – Most laps led.)

References

External links
 

Living people
NASCAR drivers
ARCA Menards Series drivers
People from Marine, Illinois
1961 births
Racing drivers from Illinois